Tomi Körkkö (born 26 March 1991) is a Finnish professional ice hockey player who is currently playing for Vaasan Sport in the Liiga.

References

1991 births
Finnish ice hockey forwards
Oulun Kärpät players
Living people
KalPa players
Sportspeople from Oulu